Bhubaneswar Development Authority (BDA) is a statutory agency which is responsible for development and beautification of Bhubaneswar, the capital city of Odisha. It was established on 1 September 1983. BDA is responsible for creating development plans, regulating development and use of land, undertaking works pertaining to construction of housing colonies, commercial complexes and providing public amenities like water supply, drainage, sewerage, and transportation, social facilities etc. Apart from the main city, Bhubaneswar, BDA covers 556 revenue villages covering an area of about 1110 km2.

Jurisdiction Map
BDA Jurisdiction Map

External links
 Official Website of Bhubaneswar Development Authority
 The Orissa Development Authorities Act, 1982
 BDA (Planning & Building Standards) Regulations, 2018
 Scheme for Regularisation of Unauthorised Constructions, 2019
 BhubaneswarOne - GIS based online map

Government of Bhubaneswar
State urban development authorities of India
State agencies of Odisha
1983 establishments in Orissa
Government agencies established in 1983